The Honeywell HTS900 is an American turboshaft engine produced by Honeywell Aerospace. A growth version of the LTS101 which it is designed to replace, the HTS900 is in the 1,000 shp (745 kW) class.

Applications
 Bell ARH-70 Arapaho
 Kopter SH09 (Marenco SwissHelicopter SKYe SH09)
 XTI TriFan 600

Specifications (HTS900)

 Control system: FADEC: dual channel ECU + electromechanical backup

See also

References

External links
 Honeywell HTS900 page
 
 

HTS900
2000s turboshaft engines